Craig Schira (born April 21, 1988) is a Canadian professional ice hockey defenceman. He currently plays under contract with Linköping HC in the Swedish Hockey League (SHL).

Playing career
Schira played for the Regina Pats and the Vancouver Giants of the Western Hockey League as a junior. On March 9, 2009, Schira signed a three-year entry level contract with the Ottawa Senators of the National Hockey League. He was assigned to the Binghamton Senators for the 2009–10 season where he completed his first professional season.

In the 2013–14 he continued his European career by signing a two-year deal with Finnish Liiga team HPK.

Entering his fourth year with Rögle BK of the SHL in the 2020–21 season, Schira having declined in his offensive output with the club, was loaned on a short-term basis to fellow SHL competitors HV71 on December 11, 2020. Schira made 4 appearances and collected 2 goals before ending his loan with HV71. On December 31, 2020, Schira left Rögle BK by moving to Germany to sign for the remainder of the season with Adler Mannheim of the Deutsche Eishockey Liga (DEL).

Career statistics

Regular season and playoffs

International

References

External links

1988 births
Living people
Adler Mannheim players
Binghamton Senators players
Canadian expatriate ice hockey players in Finland
Canadian expatriate ice hockey players in Norway
Canadian expatriate ice hockey players in Sweden
Canadian expatriate ice hockey players in the United States
Canadian ice hockey defencemen
Frisk Asker Ishockey players
HPK players
HV71 players
Linköping HC players
Luleå HF players
Regina Pats players
Rögle BK players
Vancouver Giants players